HNLMS Kortenaer may refer to following ships of the Royal Netherlands Navy:

 , an 
 , an 
 , a British S-class destroyer previously HMS Scorpion purchased in 1945 and scrapped in 1963
 , a 

Royal Netherlands Navy ship names